Benjamin Franklin Johns (March 9, 1830 - December 31, 1907) was an American Democratic politician and lawyer. He was the Speaker of the Mississippi House of Representatives from 1880 to 1882.

Early life and career 
Benjamin Franklin Johns was born in Amite County, Mississippi, on March 9, 1830. He was the eldest of the six surviving children of William F. Johns (1802-1882) and Rachel (Courtney) Johns (1807-1883). Johns attended the common schools of Amite County before attending the Western Military Institute for two years. He became a teacher for two years and then read law and was admitted to the bar in 1855. He then began practicing law in Liberty, Mississippi. When the American Civil War began in 1861, Johns joined the Confederate States Army and left Amite County with the position of Captain of the Second Company of Amite County. He was re-assigned to the Tennessee Army, during which time he was eventually promoted to the rank of colonel.

Political career 
In 1866, Johns was elected to the office of probate judge. In 1875, Johns was elected to represent Amite County in the Mississippi House of Representatives and served in the 1876 and 1877 sessions. Johns was re-elected to the House in 1879 for the 1880-1882 term. During this term, Johns was elected to be the House's Speaker. In 1887, Johns moved his law practice to Gloster, Mississippi.

Johns died suddenly on December 31, 1907, in Gloster, Mississippi.

References 

1830 births
1907 deaths
Speakers of the Mississippi House of Representatives
Democratic Party members of the Mississippi House of Representatives
People from Gloster, Mississippi
Confederate States Army officers
Mississippi lawyers